Balgatia was a town of ancient Bithynia, inhabited during Byzantine times.

Its site is located Juliopolis and Sykeon, in Asiatic Turkey.

References

Populated places in Bithynia
Former populated places in Turkey
Populated places of the Byzantine Empire
History of Ankara Province